Callophrys hesseli, or Hessel's hairstreak, is a butterfly of the family Lycaenidae. It ranges from southern Maine south along the Atlantic coastal plain to northern Florida on the Gulf Coast. The species was first described (as Mitoura hesseli) by George W. Rawson and J. Benjamin Ziegler in 1950, in honor of the lepidopterist Sidney Adolphus Hessel. It is listed as endangered in Connecticut by state authorities.

The wingspan is 25–28 mm. Adults are on wing in one generation in late May in New England, but there are two generations with adults on wing from April to July in the south.

The caterpillars feed on Atlantic white-cedar (Chamaecyparis thyoides) and adults consume nectar from flowers including swamp milkweed, shadbush, sand myrtle, sweet pepperbush, highbush blueberry, buttonbush, and dogbane.

Subspecies
Callophrys hesseli hesseli
Callophrys hesseli angulata (Gatrelle, 2001) (South Carolina)

References

hesseli
Butterflies of North America
Butterflies described in 1950